Prosopalpus is a genus of skippers in the family Hesperiidae.

Species
Prosopalpus debilis (Plötz, 1879)
Prosopalpus saga Evans, 1937
Prosopalpus styla Evans, 1937

References

External links
Natural History Museum Lepidoptera genus database

Erionotini
Hesperiidae genera